Basipterini is a tribe of beetles in the subfamily Cerambycinae. It contains the following genera and species, found in South America:

 Genus Basiptera
 Basiptera castaneipennis Thomson, 1864
 Genus Diastrophosternus
 Diastrophosternus bruchi Gounelle, 1911

References

Cerambycinae
Polyphaga tribes